Kuo Tsai-chieh (born 19 February 1986), also known as Amber Kuo, is a Taiwanese singer and actress.

Career
Kuo made her debut in the music video of "我們小時候" (When We Were Young) by Taiwanese singer Tank. She was also featured in Stefanie Sun's music video of "雨天" (Rainy day) and F.I.R's music video "其實還愛你". She was featured in the song "This Is Love (就是愛)" on Nicholas Teo's album The Moment Of Silence (沉默的瞬間).

Kuo has also released five solo Mandarin solo albums.

She was nominated in 2010 for Best Actress at the 45th Golden Bell Awards for her role in The Happy Times of That Year. She was awarded Best New Talent at the 12th Taipei Film Festival in 2010 for her role in Au Revoir Taipei.

Kuo is also known for her role in the Tiny Times film series.

Personal life
Kuo graduated from National Taipei University with a bachelor's degree in social work in 2008.

Kuo is a self-professed Christian and was baptised at Taipei Truth Lutheran Church on 31 May 2013.

Filmography

Film

Television series

Music videos

Discography

Studio albums

Soundtrack albums

Awards and nominations

References

External links 

 Amber Kuo's Official Warner Music Taiwan site

1986 births
Living people
Taiwanese film actresses
Taiwanese Mandopop singers
Taiwanese television actresses
Actresses from Taipei
Musicians from Taipei
Taiwanese Christians
21st-century Taiwanese actresses
21st-century Taiwanese singers
21st-century Taiwanese women singers